Money and Fame or Money & Fame may refer to:

"Money and Fame", a 1990 song by Scorpions from Crazy World
"Money & Fame", a 2016 song by Needtobreathe from Hard Love
Money and Fame (TV series), a 1992 series on TVB